Carl Schroeder is an American composer based in Minnesota.

His works include the orchestral elegy "Christine's Lullaby"; "The Minnesota Portraits," a three-movement suite for concert band; "88 Keys," a composition for solo piano using the instrument's 88 keys once each; "Two December Carols," a set of two holiday carols for accompanied choir; "Birmingham," a work for orchestra and narrator inspired by the Letter from Birmingham Jail of Dr. Martin Luther King Jr.; "Remembrance," a concert band tribute to soldiers who served in the American Civil War; "Spin," a concert band work inspired by biking trips on the Root River State Trail in southeastern Minnesota; and "Lake Harriet Bandshell Blues," a concert band work that celebrates the outdoor bandshell performance venue at Lake Harriet (Minnesota).

References

External links
Carl Schroeder official web site

Living people
American male composers
21st-century American composers
21st-century American male musicians
Year of birth missing (living people)